Caine may refer to:

People
 Caine (surname), a name (including a list of people with the surname)

Fictional entities
 Caine Soren, a character in the novel series Gone by Michael Grant
 Caine, an alternate spelling of the biblical Cain, and mythical first Vampire in the World of Darkness fictional universe
 Caine, the antihero of the Heroes Die novel written by Matthew Stover 
 Caine the Longshot, a character in the manga and anime series Trigun
 Caine, one of Corwin's brothers in The Chronicles of Amber series of fantasy novels
 Horatio Caine, from the CSI: Miami television series
 Kwai Chang Caine, a Shaolin monk from the Kung Fu television series
 Caine "Kaydee" Lawson, the main character in Menace II Society film
 Solomon Caine, a character in the Driver video game franchise
 U.S.S. Caine, fictional ship of The Caine Mutiny franchise

Places
 La Caine, a commune in Basse-Normandie, France
 Río Caine, a river in Bolivia

Other uses
 Caine Prize, for African Writing
 CAINE Linux, a digital forensics Linux distribution

See also
 Cane (disambiguation)
 Cain (disambiguation)
 Kaine (surname)
 Kaine (disambiguation)
 Kain (disambiguation)
 Kane (disambiguation)